Allium yanchiense is a plant species endemic to China, reported from Gansu, Hebei, Nei Mongol, Ningxia, Qinghai, Shaanxi and Shanxi. It grows at elevations of 1300–2000 m.

Allium yanchiense has clusters of egg-shaped bulbs each up to 20 mm in diameter. Scape is up to 40 cm long, round in cross-section. Leaves are tubular, about 2 mm across, shorter than the scape. Umbel is spherical, crowded with many white or pinkish flowers.

References

External links
line drawing of Allium yanchiense , Flora of China Illustrations vol. 24, fig. 220, 1-4 

yanchiense
Onions
Endemic flora of China
Plants described in 1980